Daryl Wesley Phillip Vaz is a Jamaican politician who is the Labour MP for Portland Western. He was the Minister of Information and Telecommunications in Jamaica from March 2009 to January 2016. His party lost the election in 2011 and Vaz served as opposition spokesman on Telecommunications. Vaz is currently Minister without Portfolio in the Ministry of Economic Growth and Job Creation, with responsibility for land, environment, climate change and investments, since the Jamaica Labour Party returned to government in March 2016. He also serves as Member of Parliament for the constituency of Portland Parish Western Division.

Early life 
He was born in Saint Andrew Parish, Jamaica to Douglas and Sonia Vaz. His father is a former president of the Jamaica Manufacturers Association and former Minister of Industry and Commerce.

Personal life 
Vaz's wife Ann-Marie Vaz is MP for Portland Eastern.

Controversy
Daryl Vaz engendered some controversy over his dual United States/Jamaican nationality. His mother, Sonia, was born in Puerto Rico and thus is a United States citizen by birth, albeit also a Jamaican citizen, currently resident in Canada. In 2008 or 2009 he renounced his United States citizenship in order to remain active in Jamaican politics.

Vaz was charged with corruption after an investigation into a traffic violation and bribery charge involving a close personal friend. Vaz's friend Bruce Bicknell was ticketed on 9 April 2012, in a traffic offence and allegedly presented the police officer with JA$2000 along with vehicle documents. It is alleged that Mr. Vaz told the police sergeant in the case that he would be promoted if he gave Bicknell a chance. Vaz stepped down from his shadow minister post for the Opposition Jamaica Labour Party (JLP), as a result of the corruption charges.

References

Year of birth missing (living people)
Living people
Government ministers of Jamaica
Jamaican people of Puerto Rican descent
Members of the House of Representatives of Jamaica
People from Saint Andrew Parish, Jamaica
Former United States citizens
Puerto Rican people of Jamaican descent
People from Portland Parish
Members of the 14th Parliament of Jamaica